Asclepias humistrata, the sandhill milkweed, is a species of milkweed plant. It is also known as pinewoods milkweed and pink-veined milkplant. It belongs in the subfamily Asclepiadoideae. It is native to the southeastern United States. It blooms in spring and summer. The flowers are pink lavender and white. It is found in well-drained areas such as sandy woodlands, sandy hills, and Florida scrub. Sandhill milkweed likes dry soil and sunny places.

References

External links

humistrata
Flora of Alabama
Flora of Florida